Costa Serena is a  for the Italian cruise line, Costa Crociere. The name Serena was intended to symbolize harmony and serenity.

Costa Serena was constructed by Fincantieri in Sestri Ponente. She had an older sister ship, launched in 2005. Costa Serenas godmother is Marion Cotillard.

Construction and career
19 May 2007 marked the day of Costa Serenas inaugural event. The event was held in Marseille, France, and featured fireworks and a laser show. At the same time as the actual inauguration, Costa held an inaugural event in the virtual world of Second Life.

In 2015, she re-positioned  to Shanghai to sail year-round cruises from China visiting ports in Japan and South Korea. These sailings are catered for Chinese guests and are only bookable through Chinese travel agencies. Costa Serena currently sails from Shanghai year-round.

2020 COVID-19 outbreak

Fifteen passengers aboard Costa Serena on 24 January were suspected to have SARS-CoV-2.  The ship arrived at its destination, Tianjin, China, on 25 January.  Quarantine officials boarded the ship to screen all passengers and crew member, and found 17 people with fevers.  All tests returned negative later that day, and everyone was ordered to disembark and have their photographs and temperatures taken as an additional precaution.

In popular culture
In 2007 Costa Serena was used for the setting of the movie Natale in Crociera.

In 2009 Costa Serena and her crew was featured in the six-episode National Geographic Channel documentary series Cruise Ship Diaries.

References

External links 
 

Ships of Costa Cruises
Ships built in Genoa
Ships built by Fincantieri
2006 ships